Lanka Graphite Limited is a company engaged in the exploration, development and mining of graphite in Sri Lanka. It was listed on the Australian Securities Exchange in August 2015 and delisted on August 4, 2020

References

External links 
  lankagraphite.com.au

Mining companies of Australia
Companies formerly listed on the Australian Securities Exchange
Companies based in Melbourne
Holding companies of Australia
Holding companies established in 2015
Australian companies established in 2015